Cédric Olondo (born 31 December 1982) is a retired Belgian football striker.

References

1982 births
Living people
Democratic Republic of the Congo emigrants to Belgium
Belgian footballers
Standard Liège players
RFC Liège players
K.S.K. Ronse players
Fortuna Sittard players
TOP Oss players
Ethnikos Piraeus F.C. players
Belgian expatriate footballers
Expatriate footballers in the Netherlands
Belgian expatriate sportspeople in the Netherlands
Expatriate footballers in Greece
Belgian expatriate sportspeople in Greece
Belgian Pro League players
Eerste Divisie players
Association football forwards